"Creatures of the Night" is a song by American hard rock band Kiss, released as a single from their 1982 album of the same name. It was only released in the UK, where it reached #34. The song was written by Paul Stanley and Adam Mitchell in Mitchell's kitchen. It is not clear who plays what on the track but it is assumed that bass was not played by Gene Simmons, but Mike Porcaro who would later play with American rock band Toto. Lead guitar was not played by Ace Frehley as he was not musically involved with the album and it was not played by Vinnie Vincent either; it was played by Steve Farris, who would go on to be the lead guitarist of the 1980s pop rock group Mr. Mister. Adam Mitchell also played in the final version of the song, replacing Stanley on rhythm guitar in the middle and end of the song.

Live performances
"Creatures of the Night" was performed during the Creatures of the Night Tour and Lick It Up Tour as an opening song and moved to the middle of the set on the Animalize Tour before being dropped from the set-list on the upcoming three tours and then again included in the set-list for the Revenge Tour and Kiss My Ass Tour, as an opening track, again.

Appearances
"Creatures of the Night" has appeared on following Kiss albums:
Creatures of the Night - original studio version (The 1985 reissue of the album contains a remixed version of the song, with more reverb.)
Alive III - live version
Chikara - remixed version
The Box Set - remixed version
The Best of Kiss, Volume 2: The Millennium Collection - studio version
Kiss Rocks Vegas - live

"Creatures of the Night" cover:
Iced Earth covered "Creatures of the Night" for their cover album Tribute to the Gods.
Kefren's version is featured on their 1997 self-titled album.
Depravity was the first band to cover "Creatures of the Night", in 1991 on a six track demo tape "Galvanizer".
Saxorior covered "Creatures of the Night" for their 2008 album Völkerschlacht.

Personnel
Paul Stanley – lead vocals, rhythm guitar
Eric Carr – drums, backing vocals
Mike Porcaro – bass
Steve Farris – lead guitar
Adam Mitchell – additional guitar
Gene Simmons – backing vocals

Charts

Peak positions

References

Kiss (band) songs
1982 singles
Songs written by Paul Stanley
Casablanca Records singles
1982 songs
Songs written by Adam Mitchell (songwriter)